Alexandru Ionescu (born 10 March 1903; date of death unknown) was a Romanian bobsledder who competed in the 1930s.

Competing in two Winter Olympics, he earned his best finish of sixth in the four-man event at Lake Placid in 1932.

Four years later at the 1936 Winter Olympics he was again a member of the Romanian bobsled team, but they did not finish in the four-man competition

References
1932 bobsleigh four-man results
1936 bobsleigh four-man results
1936 Olympic Winter Games official report.  - p. 415.

1903 births
Year of death missing
Romanian male bobsledders
Olympic bobsledders of Romania
Bobsledders at the 1932 Winter Olympics
Bobsledders at the 1936 Winter Olympics